The 40th Gawad Urian Awards or Ika-40 na Gawad Urian was held on July 20, 2017 at Studio 10 of ABS-CBN. They honored the best Filipino films for the year 2016. It aired live at Cinema One channel.

Nominations were announced on June 27. Women of the Weeping River received the most nominations with twelve.

Women of the Weeping River won the most awards with six awards, including Best Film. The Natatanging Gawad Urian was awarded to Vilma Santos.

Winners and nominees

Multiple nominations and awards

References

External links
 Official Website of the Manunuri ng Pelikulang Pilipino

Gawad Urian Awards
2016 film awards
2017 in Philippine cinema